Ishanou (English: The Chosen One) is a 1990 Indian Meitei language film written by M. K. Binodini Devi and directed by Aribam Syam Sharma. The movie stars Anoubam Kiranmala and Kangabam Tomba in the lead roles. It was screened in the Un Certain Regard section at the 1991 Cannes Film Festival. The movie was first aired in Doordarshan and later released in Usha Cinema, Paona Bazar on 6 July 1990.

Ishanou was screened at many film festivals, which include Singapore International Film Festival, London Film Festival, Des 3 Continents, Festival of Festivals Toronto, International Film Festival Rotterdam, Fribourg International Film Festival, Hawaii International Film Festival, Vancouver International Film Festival, Tokyo International Film Festival, Seattle International Film Festival and International Film Festival of India.

Plot
In a small village of Manipur, Tampha, the young and tacitum wife of Dhanabir, works in an office and the couple lead a routine life with their child. But when her husband takes for a ride on a two wheeler through the hilly country to amuse her, she has dizzy spells. She is also seized from time to time by convulsions and she begins to wander at night. One night she reaches the house of an exclusively female and matriarchal religious sect of Maibis, possessors of the previlege of ritual invocations to the gods of the ancient pantheon of Manipur. But her sickness is not one that medicine or even magic can cure. Her possession is of another nature, sacred, in fact, the direct search for the goddess Maibi. Tampha, like in a daydream, leaves everything to become an initiate of the sect. At the end of the film, she meets her husband, who has remarried and her daughter, two people from whom she is now alienated, in the truest sense of the term.

Cast
 Anoubam Kiranmala as Tampha
 Kangabam Tomba as Dhanabir, Tampha's Husband
 Baby Molly as Bembem, Tampha's Daughter
 Manbi as Tampha's Mother
 Soraisam Dhiren as Tampha's neighbour
 Baby Premita
 Nungshirei Maibi, Dhani Maibi
 Mema Maibi, Sakhen Maibi
 Tekpicha Maibi, Bino Maibi
 Sakhi Maibi, Mema Maibi
 Memcha Maibi, Rupobati Maibi

Reception
Derek Malcolm, in 1991, wrote about the film on The Guardian, "Perhaps the best film in the panorama, largely because it tells a good story with great honesty and lack of guile, came from the State of Manipur, where two or three directors have worked against all odds for a decade or more". Former director of Sydney Film Festival and Film Critic David Stratton also wrote in the Variety published from New York on 11 April 1991, "One of the best Indian films of the past year, The Chosen One looks though it’ll make its way on the international film circuit. Specialized art house release also is possible".

Accolades
Ishanou won the National Film Award for Best Feature Film in Manipuri and Special Mention (Anoubam Kiranmala) at the 38th National Film Awards. The citation for the National Award reads, "For effectively portraying the tragedy behind the institution of Maibi which unfortunately shatters a family". Special Mention's citation reads, "For a debut performance depicting various levels of conflict effectively".

References

External links
 

1990 films
Films directed by Aribam Syam Sharma
Meitei-language films
Meitei folklore in popular culture